Holbon was the first capital of Goguryeo, which arose in the north of the Korean Peninsula. Holbon is thought to have been in modern Wunü Mountain, Liaoning.
 
In 37 BC, Jumong had fled from Dongbuyeo to avoid death at the hands of Dongbuyeo's Crown Prince Daeso, who presented great jealousy towards Jumong. After he fled, Jumong established a new kingdom in 37 BC called Goguryeo in the Holbon region. In Holbon, he married Soseono (or So Seo-no), who was the daughter of a local tribal leader.

Holbon was the first capital city of the ancient Korean Kingdom of Goguryeo from 37 BC – 3 AD.  The second ruler, the son of Jumong, Yuri, moved its capital to Gungnae Fortress.

References

See also 
 Buyeo kingdom
 Goguryeo
 King Dongmyeong of Goguryeo
 Soseono

Goguryeo
History of Korea
Former countries in Korean history
Former countries in East Asia